Thomas Hill was Archdeacon of Derby from 1847 to 1873.

Hill was educated at Trinity College, Cambridge. He was ordained deacon in 1811 and priest in 1812.
He was vicar of Badgeworth from 1821 to 1847 (Crockford's Clerical Directory, 1865 edition).

He died on 14 September 1875. St Thomas' Church, Derby was built in his memory.

Notes

Alumni of Trinity College, Cambridge
Archdeacons of Derby
1875 deaths
Year of birth missing